Killa Hosakoti is a village in Bagalkot district in the southern state of Karnataka, India.

Villages in Bagalkot district